Freefall is a 1994 American direct-to-video action film starring Eric Roberts, Jeff Fahey and Pamela Gidley. It is directed by John Irvin, written and produced by David Zito and Les Weldon.

Plot
Wildlife photographer Katy Mazur is sent to Africa on an assignment by her fiancé Dex Dellum to track down the rare bird falcon talon. While there, she meets a parachuter named Grant Orion, whom she has an affair with. Little does she know, he is there to rescue her from becoming a target of an assassin organisation.

Release
Originally intended for a theatrical release, the movie was released straight to VHS in the United States by Vidmark Entertainment and in Canada that same year by Cineplex Odeon. In 2002, Platinum Disc released a DVD of the film.

It was also released straight to video in the UK by Medusa Home Video.

External links
 
 

1994 action films
1994 films
American action films
American direct-to-video films
Direct-to-video action films
Films directed by John Irvin
Films scored by Lee Holdridge
Trimark Pictures films
1990s English-language films
1990s American films